La Perrière is a former commune in the Orne department in north-western France. On 1 January 2017, it was merged into the new commune Belforêt-en-Perche.

See also
Communes of the Orne department

References

Perriere